Wolfgang Amadeus Mozart (1756–1791) was a prolific composer and wrote in many genres. Perhaps his best-admired work is in opera, piano concerto, piano sonata, symphony, string quartet, and string quintet. Mozart also wrote many violin sonatas, and other forms of chamber music, violin concertos, and other concertos for one or more solo instruments, masses, and other religious music, organ music, masonic music, and numerous dances, marches, divertimentos, serenades, and other forms of light entertainment.

How Mozart's compositions are listed 
This catalog has been amended several times, leading to ambiguity over some KV numbers (see e.g. Symphony No. 25).
 The compositions of Mozart listed below are grouped thematically, i.e. by type of composition. Not all thematic groups of Mozart's works have a separate numbering that is generally accepted: Köchel only numbers symphonies (1 to 41), piano concertos (1 to 27, leaving out some early transcriptions by Mozart) and a few other groups. On the other hand, for most chamber music and vocal music there is no such numbering (or at least no generally accepted one).
 Only relatively few of Mozart's compositions have opus numbers, as not so many of his compositions were published during his lifetime, so numbering by opus number proves quite impractical for Mozart compositions.

Symphonies 

Mozart's symphonic production covers a 24-year interval, from 1764 to 1788. According to most recent investigations, Mozart wrote not just the 41 symphonies reported in traditional editions, but up to 68 complete works of this type. However, by convention, the original numbering has been retained, and so his last symphony is still known as "No. 41". Some of the symphonies (K. 297, 385, 550) were revised by the author after their first versions.

Childhood symphonies (1764–1771) 
These are the numbered symphonies from Mozart's early childhood.
 Symphony No. 1 in E major, K. 16 (1764)
 Symphony No. 2 in B major, K. 17 (spurious, attributed to Leopold Mozart) (1765?)
 Symphony No. 3 in E major, K. 18 (spurious, written by Carl Friedrich Abel) (1767?)
 Symphony No. 4 in D major, K. 19 (1765)
 Symphony No. 5 in B major, K. 22 (1765)
 Symphony No. 6 in F major, K. 43 (1767)
 Symphony No. 7 in D major, K. 45 (1768)
 Symphony No. 8 in D major, K. 48 (1768)
 Symphony No. 9 in C major, K. 73/75a (1769-70?)
 Symphony No. 10 in G major, K. 74 (1770)
 Symphony No. 11 in D major, K. 84/73q (uncertain) (1770)
 Symphony No. 12 in G major, K. 110/75b (1771)
 Symphony No. 13 in F major, K. 112 (1771)

There are also several "unnumbered" symphonies from this time period. Many of them were given numbers past 41 (but not in chronological order) in an older collection of Mozart's works (Mozart-Werke, 1877–1910, referred to as "GA"), but newer collections refer to them only by their entries in the Köchel catalogue. Many of these cannot be definitively established as having been written by Mozart (see here).

 Symphony in F major, K. 75 (GA 42: doubtful) (1771)
 Symphony in F major, K. 76/42a (GA 43: doubtful) (1767)
 Symphony in D major, K. 81/73l (GA 44: doubtful) (1770)
 Symphony in D major, K. 95/73n (GA 45: doubtful) (1770)
 Symphony in C major, K. 96/111b (GA 46: doubtful) (1771)
 Symphony in D major, K. 97/73m (GA 47: doubtful) (1770)
 Symphony in F major, K. 98/Anh. C 11.04 (GA 48/56: doubtful) (1771?)
 Symphony in B major, K. Anh. 214/45b (GA 55: doubtful) (1768)
 Symphony in B major, K. Anh. 216/74g/Anh. C 11.03 (GA 54: doubtful) (1771)
 Symphony in G major, "Old Lambach", K. Anh. 221/45a (1766)
 Symphony in F major, K. Anh. 223/19a (1765)
 Symphony in A minor, "Odense", K. Anh. 220/16a (doubtful) (1765?)

Salzburg-era symphonies (1771–1777) 
These symphonies are sometimes subcategorized as "Early" (1771–1773) and "Late" (1773–1777), and sometimes subcategorized as "Germanic" (with minuet) or "Italian" (without minuet). None of these were printed during Mozart's lifetime.

Although not counted as "symphonies" the three Divertimenti K. 136–138, in 3-movement Italian overture style, are sometimes indicated as "Salzburg Symphonies" too.
 Symphony No. 14 in A major, K. 114 (1771)
 Symphony No. 15 in G major, K. 124 (1772)
 Symphony No. 16 in C major, K. 128 (1772)
 Symphony No. 17 in G major, K. 129 (1772)
 Symphony No. 18 in F major, K. 130 (1772)
 Symphony No. 19 in E major, K. 132 (1772)
 Symphony No. 20 in D major, K. 133 (1772)
 Symphony No. 21 in A major, K. 134 (1772)
 Symphony No. 22 in C major, K. 162 (1773)
 Symphony No. 23 in D major, K. 181/162b (1773)
 Symphony No. 24 in B major, K. 182/173dA (1773)
 Symphony No. 25 in G minor, K. 183/ (1773)
 Symphony No. 26 in E major, K. 184/161a (1773)
 Symphony No. 27 in G major, K. 199/161b (1773)
 Symphony No. 28 in C major, K. 200/189k (1774)
 Symphony No. 29 in A major, K. 201/186a (1774)
 Symphony No. 30 in D major, K. 202/186b (1774)

There are also several "unnumbered" symphonies from this time period that make use of music from Mozart's operas from the same time period. They are also given numbers past 41.

 Symphony in D major, K. 111+(120/111a) (GA 48) (1771)
 Symphony in D major, K. (126+(161/163))/141a (GA 50) (1772)
 Symphony in D major, K. 196+(121/207a) (GA 51) (1774-75)
 Symphony in C major, K. 208+(102/213c) (GA 52) (1775)
 Symphony in D major, K. 135+61h (1772?)

There are also three symphonies from this time period that are based on three of Mozart's serenades:

 Symphony in D major, K. 204 (based on the Serenade No. 5) (1775)
 Symphony in D major, K. 250 (based on the "Haffner" serenade) (1776)
 Symphony in D major, K. 320 (based on the "Posthorn" serenade) (1779)

Late symphonies (1778–1788) 
 Symphony No. 31 in D major, "Paris", K. 297/300a (1778)
 Symphony No. 32 in G major, "Overture in the Italian style", K. 318 (1779)
 Symphony No. 33 in B major, K. 319 (1779)
 Symphony No. 34 in C major, K. 338 (1780)
 Symphony No. 35 in D major, "Haffner", K. 385 (1782)
 Symphony No. 36 in C major, "Linz", K. 425 (1783)
 Symphony No. 37 in G major, K. 444 (1783)
For years this was categorized as a Mozart symphony, but later scholarship determined that it was actually composed by Michael Haydn (Symphony No. 25), and Mozart wrote only the slow introduction for it.
 Symphony No. 38 in D major, "Prague", K. 504 (1786)
The three final symphonies (Nos. 39–41) were completed in about three months in 1788. It is likely that Mozart hoped to publish these three works together as a single opus, but they remained unpublished until after his death. One or two of them might have been played in public in Leipzig in 1789.
 Symphony No. 39 in E major, K. 543 (1788)
 Symphony No. 40 in G minor, K. 550 (1788)
 Symphony No. 41 in C major, "Jupiter", K. 551 (1788)

Concertos

Piano concertos 

Mozart's concertos for piano and orchestra are numbered from 1 to 27. The first four numbered concertos are early works. The movements of these concertos are arrangements of keyboard sonatas by various contemporary composers (Raupach, Honauer, Schobert, Eckart, C. P. E. Bach). There are also three unnumbered concertos, K. 107, which are adapted from piano sonatas by J. C. Bach. Concertos 7 and 10 are compositions for three and two pianos respectively. The remaining twenty-one, listed below, are original compositions for solo piano and orchestra. Among them, fifteen were written in the years from 1782 to 1786, while in the last five years Mozart wrote just two more piano concertos.

 Piano Concerto No. 5 in D major, K. 175 (1773)
 Piano Concerto No. 6 in B major, K. 238 (1776)
 Piano Concerto No. 7 in F major for Three Pianos, "Lodron", K. 242 (1776)
 Piano Concerto No. 8 in C major, "Lützow", K. 246 (1776)
 Piano Concerto No. 9 in E major, "Jenamy", K. 271 (1777)
 Piano Concerto No. 10 in E major for Two Pianos, K. 365/316a (1779)
 Piano Concerto No. 11 in F major, K. 413/387a (1782-83)
 Piano Concerto No. 12 in A major, K. 414/385p (1782)
 Piano Concerto No. 13 in C major, K. 415/387b (1782-83)
 Piano Concerto No. 14 in E major, K. 449 (1784)
 Piano Concerto No. 15 in B major, K. 450 (1784)
 Piano Concerto No. 16 in D major, K. 451 (1784)
 Piano Concerto No. 17 in G major, K. 453 (1784)
 Piano Concerto No. 18 in B major, K. 456 (1784)
 Piano Concerto No. 19 in F major, K. 459 (1784)
 Piano Concerto No. 20 in D minor, K. 466 (1785)
 Piano Concerto No. 21 in C major, K. 467 (1785)
 Piano Concerto No. 22 in E major, K. 482 (1785)
 Piano Concerto No. 23 in A major, K. 488 (1786)
 Piano Concerto No. 24 in C minor, K. 491 (1786)
 Piano Concerto No. 25 in C major, K. 503 (1786)
 Piano Concerto No. 26 in D major, "Coronation", K. 537 (1788)
 Piano Concerto No. 27 in B major, K. 595 (1791)

There are also two isolated rondos for piano and orchestra:
 Rondo for piano and orchestra in D major, K. 382 (1782)
 Rondo for piano and orchestra in A major, K. 386 (1782)

The early arrangements are as follows:
 Piano Concerto No. 1 in F major, K. 37 (1767)
 Piano Concerto No. 2 in B major, K. 39 (1767)
 Piano Concerto No. 3 in D major, K. 40 (1767)
 Piano Concerto No. 4 in G major, K. 41 (1767)
 Three Piano Concertos in D major, G major and E major, K. 107 (1771 or 1765)

Others
36 Cadenzas, K. 624/626a (1768-91; the list of all the cadenzas that Mozart wrote for his own piano concertos and piano concertos of contemporaries)

Violin concertos 
Mozart's five violin concertos were written in Salzburg around 1775, except the first around 1773. They are notable for the beauty of their melodies and the skillful use of the expressive and technical characteristics of the instrument, though Mozart likely never went through all the violin possibilities that others (e.g. Beethoven and Brahms) did after him. (Alfred Einstein notes that the violin concerto-like sections in the serenades are more virtuosic than in the works titled Violin Concertos.)
 Violin Concerto No. 1 in B major, K. 207 (1773)
 Violin Concerto No. 2 in D major, K. 211 (1775)
 Violin Concerto No. 3 in G major, "Straßburg", K. 216 (1775)
 Violin Concerto No. 4 in D major, K. 218 (1775)
 Violin Concerto No. 5 in A major, "Turkish", K. 219 (1775)

Mozart also wrote a concertone for two violins and orchestra, an adagio and two stand-alone rondos for violin and orchestra.
 Concertone for two Violins and Orchestra in C major, K. 190/186E (1774)
 Adagio for violin and orchestra in E major, K. 261 (1776)
 Rondo for violin and orchestra in B major, K. 269/261a (between 1775 and 1777)
 Rondo for violin and orchestra in C major, K. 373 (1781)

In addition, there are three works that are spuriously attributed to Mozart.
 Violin Concerto in E major, K. 268/365a/Anh. C 14.04 ("No. 6") (1780) (attributed to Johann Friedrich Eck)
 Violin Concerto in D major, "Kolb", K. 271a/271i ("No. 7") (1777) (doubtful)
 Violin Concerto in D major, "Adélaïde", K. Anh. 294a/Anh. C 14.05 (1933) (actually written by Marius Casadesus)

Horn concertos 

Arguably the most widely played concertos for horn, the four Horn Concertos are a major part of most professional horn players' repertoire. They were written for Mozart's lifelong friend Joseph Leutgeb. The concertos (especially the fourth) were written as virtuoso vehicles that allow the soloist to show a variety of abilities on the valveless horns of Mozart's day.

The Horn Concertos are characterized by an elegant and humorous dialogue between the soloist and the orchestra. Many of the autographs contain jokes aimed at the dedicatee.
 Horn Concerto No. 1 in D major, K. 412 (1791, unfinished at Mozart's death)
 Horn Concerto No. 2 in E major, K. 417 (1783)
 Horn Concerto No. 3 in E major, K. 447 (c. 1784–7)
 Horn Concerto No. 4 in E major, K. 495 (1786)

There are some other unfinished Mozart works for horn and orchestra:

 Horn Concerto, K. 370b+371 in E major (1781)
 Horn Concerto, K. 494a in E major (c. 1785–6)

Woodwind concertos 

 Bassoon Concerto in B major, K. 191 (1774)
 Concerto for Flute, Harp, and Orchestra in C major, K. 299 (1778)
 Oboe Concerto in C major, K. 314 (1777–78) (has come down to us as the second flute concerto, but was almost certainly an oboe concerto)
 Flute Concerto No. 1 in G major, K. 313 (1778)
 Flute Concerto No. 2 in D major, K. 314 (1778) (an arrangement of the above Oboe Concerto)
 Andante for flute and orchestra in C major, K. 315/285e (1778)
 Clarinet Concerto in A major, K. 622 (1791; originally was for basset horn and was in the key of G major)
 Bassoon Concerto in B major, K. 230a/Anh. C 14.03 (Discovered in set of parts in The Hague attributed to Mozart; authenticity widely doubted from start. Most likely composed by François Devienne)
 Oboe Concerto in E major, K.Anh.C 14.06 (Doubtful authenticity)

Others
 Basset Horn Concerto in G major, K. 584b (fragment; transcribed and finished to the well-known clarinet concerto)

Concertante symphonies 

 Sinfonia Concertante for Violin, Viola and Orchestra in E major, K. 364 (1779)
 Sinfonia Concertante for Oboe, Clarinet, Horn, Bassoon and Orchestra in E major, K. 297b (Anh. 9 and later Anh. C 14.01) (probably spurious arrangement of lost Sinfonia Concertante for Flute, Oboe, Horn, Bassoon and Orchestra from 1778)

These were not Mozart's only attempts at the genre; a few other fragmentary works were also composed around the same time, though not completed.
 Sinfonia Concertante for Violin, Viola, Cello and Orchestra in A major, K. 320e (Anh. 104) (c. 1779, fragment)
 Sinfonia Concertante for Piano, Violin and Orchestra in D major, K. 315f (Anh. 56) (1778, fragment)

Other concertos 
 Concerto for Trumpet, K. 47c (1768, lost)
 Cello Concerto, K. 206a (1775, lost)

Piano music 
Mozart's earliest composition attempts begin with piano sonatas and other piano pieces, as this is the instrument on which his musical education took place. Almost everything that he wrote for piano was intended to be played by himself (or by his sister, also a proficient piano player). Examples of his earliest works are those found in Nannerl's Music Book. Between 1782 and 1786, Mozart wrote 20 works for piano solo (including sonatas, variations, fantasias, suites, fugues, rondo) and works for piano four hands and two pianos.

Solo piano works

Dual piano/performer works

Piano four-hands 
 Sonata in C major for keyboard four-hands, K. 19d (doubtful) (London, May 1765)
 Sonata for Keyboard Four-hands in D major, K. 381/123a (1772)
 Sonata for Keyboard Four-hands in B major, K. 358/186c (1774)
 Sonata for Keyboard Four-hands in F major, K. 497 (1786)
 Sonata in C major for piano four-hands, K. 521 (1787)
 Sonata for Keyboard Four-hands in G major, K. 357 (incomplete) (1786)
 Fugue in G minor, K. 401 (incomplete) (1782)
 Andante and Variations in G major, K. 501 (1786)
 Adagio and Allegro in F minor for a mechanical organ, K. 594 (1790) (organ, composer's transcription)
 Fantasia in F minor, K. 608 (1791) (organ, composer's transcription)

Others
Allegro in G major, K. 357/497a (1786-87; fragment)

Two pianos 
 Sonata for Two Pianos in D major, K. 448/375a (1781)
 Fugue in C minor for Two Keyboards, K. 426 (1783) (transcribed in 1788 for string quartet as K. 546)
 Larghetto and Allegretto for Two Pianos in E major, K. deest (completed by Maximilian Stadler)

Others
Allegro in C minor for Two Pianos, K.Anh. 44/426a (1783-86; fragment)

Chamber music

Chamber music with piano

Violin music 
Mozart also wrote sonatas for keyboard and violin. For the most part, these are keyboard-centric sonatas where the violin plays a more accompanying role. In later years, the role of the violin grew to not just a support to the other solo instrument, but to build a dialogue with it.

The 'Violin Sonatas', KV 10–15, are unique in that they include an ad lib. cello part along with the score for violin and keyboard. The Neue Mozart-Ausgabe (1966) therefore includes them along with the other keyboard trios, although the Köchel catalogue (K6, 1964) lists them as normal violin sonatas.

Violin sonatas

Childhood violin sonatas (1762–66) 
Violin Sonatas, KV 6–9 (1762-64)
Sonata No. 1 in C for Keyboard and Violin, K. 6 (1762-1764)
Sonata No. 2 in D for Keyboard and Violin, K. 7 (1763-1764)
Sonata No. 3 in B for Keyboard and Violin, K. 8 (1763-1764)
Sonata No. 4 in G for Keyboard and Violin, K. 9 (1764)
Violin Sonatas, KV 10–15 (1764)
Sonata No. 5 in B for Keyboard with Violin (or Flute) and Cello, K. 10 (1764)
Sonata No. 6 in G for Keyboard with Violin (or Flute) and Cello, K. 11 (1764)
Sonata No. 7 in A for Keyboard with Violin (or Flute) and Cello, K. 12 (1764)
Sonata No. 8 in F for Keyboard with Violin (or Flute) and Cello, K. 13 (1764)
Sonata No. 9 in C for Keyboard with Violin (or Flute) and Cello, K. 14 (1764)
Sonata No. 10 in B for Keyboard with Violin (or Flute) and Cello, K. 15 (1764)
Violin Sonatas, KV 26–31 (1766)
Sonata No. 11 in E for Keyboard and Violin, K. 26 (1766)
Sonata No. 12 in G for Keyboard and Violin, K. 27 (1766)
Sonata No. 13 in C for Keyboard and Violin, K. 28 (1766)
Sonata No. 14 in D for Keyboard and Violin, K. 29 (1766)
Sonata No. 15 in F for Keyboard and Violin, K. 30 (1766)
Sonata No. 16 in B for Keyboard and Violin, K. 31 (1766)

Mature violin sonatas (1778–88) 
 Violin Sonata No. 17 in C major, K. 296 (1778)
 Violin Sonata No. 18 in G major, K. 301 (1778)
 Violin Sonata No. 19 in E major, K. 302 (1778)
 Violin Sonata No. 20 in C major, K. 303 (1778)
 Violin Sonata No. 21 in E minor, K. 304 (1778)
 Violin Sonata No. 22 in A major, K. 305 (1778)
 Violin Sonata No. 23 in D major, K. 306 (1778)
 Violin Sonata No. 24 in F major, K. 376 (1781)
 Violin Sonata No. 25 in F major, K. 377 (1781)
 Violin Sonata No. 26 in B major, K. 378 (1779)
 Violin Sonata No. 27 in G major, K. 379 (1781)
 Violin Sonata No. 28 in E major, K. 380 (1781)
 Violin Sonata No. 29 in A major, K. 402 (1782; fragment, completed by Maximilian Stadler)
 Violin Sonata No. 30 in C major, K. 403 (1782; fragment, completed by M. Stadler)
 Violin Sonata No. 31 in C major, K. 404 (1782; fragment)
 Violin Sonata No. 32 in B major, K. 454 (1784)
 Violin Sonata No. 33 in E major, K. 481 (1785)
 Violin Sonata No. 34 in B major, K. 372 Allegro (1781; fragment, completed by M. Stadler)
 Violin Sonata No. 35 in A major, K. 526 (1787)
 Violin Sonata No. 36 in F major, K. 547 (1788)

Variations for violin and piano 
 12 Variations in G major on "La bergère Célimène", K. 359 (1781)
 6 Variations in G minor on "Hélas, j'ai perdu mon amant", K. 360 (1781)

Piano trios 
 Piano Trio No. 1 in B-flat major (Divertimento), K. 254 (1776)
 Piano Trio No. 2 in G major, K. 496 (1786)
 Piano Trio No. 3 in B-flat major, K. 502 (1786)
 Piano Trio No. 4 in E major, K. 542 (1788)
 Piano Trio No. 5 in C major, K. 548 (1788)
 Piano Trio No. 6 in G major, K. 564 (1788)

Others
 Piano Trio in D minor, K. 442 (1785–88; fragment, completed by M. Stadler)
 Piano Trio in B major, K.Anh. 51/501a (1786; fragment)
 Piano Trio in G major, K.Anh. 52/495a (1786; fragment)

Piano quartets 
 Piano Quartets (piano, violin, viola, cello):
 Piano Quartet No. 1 in G minor, K. 478 (1785)
 Piano Quartet No. 2 in E major, K. 493 (1786)

Other chamber music with piano 

 Quintet for Piano and Winds (piano, oboe, clarinet, horn, bassoon) in E major, K. 452 (1784)
 Trio for Clarinet, Viola and Piano in E major, "Kegelstatt", K. 498 (1786)

Fragments
 Quintet for Piano and Winds (piano, oboe, clarinet, basset horn, bassoon) in B major, K. Anh. 54/452a (1784; fragment)

Chamber music without piano

String duos 
 Duo for Violin and Viola No. 1 in G major, K. 423 (1783)
 Duo for Violin and Viola No. 2 in B major, K. 424 (1783)

String trios 
 Trio for 2 Violins and Cello in B major, K. 266/271f (1777)
 Divertimento for String Trio in E major, K. 563 (1788)

Others
 Preludes and Fugues for Violin, Viola and Cello, K. 404a (1782)
 Trio for Violin, Viola and Cello in G major, K. Anh. 66/562e (1788, fragment)

String quartets 
String Quartet No. 1 in G major, "Lodi", K. 80/73f (1770)
 Milanese Quartets, K. 155–160 (1772–1773)
 This cycle, in three movements, is interesting as far as these works can be considered precursors of the later—more complete—string quartets.
String Quartet No. 2 in D major, K. 155/134a (1772)
String Quartet No. 3 in G major, K. 156/134b (1772)
String Quartet No. 4 in C major, K. 157 (1772–73)
String Quartet No. 5 in F major, K. 158 (1772–73)
String Quartet No. 6 in B major, K. 159 (1773)
String Quartet No. 7 in E major, K. 160/159a (1773)
 Viennese Quartets, K. 168–173 (1773)
 Much more stylistically developed. In Vienna Mozart is believed to have heard the op. 17 and op. 20 quartets of Joseph Haydn, and had received from them a deep impression.
String Quartet No. 8 in F major, K. 168 (1773)
String Quartet No. 9 in A major, K. 169 (1773)
String Quartet No. 10 in C major, K. 170 (1773)
String Quartet No. 11 in E major, K. 171 (1773)
String Quartet No. 12 in B major, K. 172 (1773)
String Quartet No. 13 in D minor, K. 173 (1773)
 Haydn Quartets, K. 387, 421, 428, 458, 464, 465, Op. 10 (1782–1785)
 Mozart returned to the quartet in the early 1780s after he had moved to Vienna, met Haydn in person, and developed a friendship with the older composer. Haydn had just published his set of six quartets, Op. 33, which are thought to have been a stimulus to Mozart in returning to the genre. These quartets are often regarded as among the pinnacles of the genre.
String Quartet No. 14 in G major, "Spring", K. 387 (1782)
String Quartet No. 15 in D minor, K. 421/417b (1783)
String Quartet No. 16 in E major, K. 428/421b (1783)
String Quartet No. 17 in B major, "Hunt", K. 458 (1784)
String Quartet No. 18 in A major, K. 464 (1785)
String Quartet No. 19 in C major, "Dissonance", K. 465 (1785)
String Quartet No. 20 in D major, "Hoffmeister", K. 499 (1786)
This work was published by (dedicated to?) Franz Anton Hoffmeister, as well as the Prussian Quartets.
 Prussian Quartets, K. 575, 589, 590, Op. 18 (1789–1790)
Mozart's last three quartets, dedicated to the King of Prussia, Friedrich Wilhelm II, are noted for the cantabile character of the parts for cello (the instrument played by the king himself), the sweetness of sounds and the equilibrium among the different instruments.
 String Quartet No. 21 in D major, K. 575 (1789)
 String Quartet No. 22 in B major, K. 589 (1790)
 String Quartet No. 23 in F major, K. 590 (1790)

Others
 Fugues for 2 Violins, Viola and Cello, K. 405 (1782)
 Adagio and Fugue in C minor for 2 Violins, Viola and Cello, K. 546 (1788) (a transcription from Fugue in C minor for Two Keyboards, K. 426)
 Canon in C major for 2 Violins, Viola and Cello, K. Anh. 191/562c (1788, attribution uncertain)
 String Quartet in E minor, K. 417d (1789; fragment)
 String Quartet in G minor, K. 587a (1789; fragment)

String quintets 
The string quintets (K. 174, 406, 515, 516, 593, 614), for two violins, two violas and cello. Charles Rosen wrote that "by general consent, Mozart's greatest achievement in chamber music is the group of string quintets with two violas."
String Quintet No. 1 in B major, K. 174 (1773)
String Quintet No. 2 in C minor, K. 406 (516b) – This is a transcription for string quintet of the earlier Serenade for wind octet in C minor, K. 388. (1787)
String Quintet No. 3 in C major, K. 515 (1787)
String Quintet No. 4 in G minor, K. 516 (1787)
String Quintet No. 5 in D major, K. 593 (1790)
String Quintet No. 6 in E major, K. 614 (1791)

Others
String Quintet in B major, K. 514a (fragment; 1787 or later)
String Quintet in A minor, K. 515c+515a (fragment; 1791)

Other chamber music without piano 
 Flute Quartets (flute, violin, viola, cello):
 Flute Quartet No. 1 in D major K. 285 (1777–1778)
 Flute Quartet No. 2 in G major K. 285a (1777–1778)
 Flute Quartet No. 3 in C major K. Anh. 171/285b (1781–1782)
 Flute Quartet No. 4 in A major K. 298 (1786–1787)
 Sonata for Bassoon and Violoncello in B major, K. 292 (1775)
 Oboe Quartet (oboe, violin, viola, cello) in F major, K. 370 (1781)
 Horn Quintet (horn, violin, two violas, cello) in E major, K. 407 (1782)
 Adagio in F major for two basset horns and bassoon, K. 410/484d (1785)
 Adagio in B major for two clarinets and three basset horns, K. 411/484a (1785)
 12 Duets for two horns in C major, K. 487 (1786, incorrectly published as being for basset horns)
 Clarinet Quintet (clarinet, two violins, viola, cello) in A major, K. 581 (1789)
 Adagio and Rondo for glass harmonica, flute, oboe, viola and cello, K. 617 (1791)
 Adagio in C major for Glass Harmonica, K. 356/617a (1791)
 Adagio in F major for clarinet and three basset horns, K.Anh. 93
 Adagio in F major for clarinet and three basset horns, K.Anh. 94
 Allegro assai in B major for two clarinets and three horns, K.Anh. 95
 Allegro in B major, K.Anh. 96 (for 2 oboes, 2 clarinets, 2 bassoons, and 2 horns)

Fragments
 Andante in B major, K. 384B (fragment; for 2 oboes, 2 clarinets, 2 bassoons, and 2 horns)
 Allegro in C major for basset horn and ??, K. 484e (fragment; with undetermined instrumentation)
 Clarinet Quintet fragment in B major, K. 516c/Anh. 91 - Allegro (for clarinet, 2 violins, viola, cello; 1787)
 Clarinet Quintet fragment in E major, K. 516d - Andante (for clarinet, 2 violins, viola, cello; 1787)
 Clarinet Quintet fragment in E major, K. 516e/Anh. 89 - Rondò (for clarinet, 2 violins, viola, cello; 1787)
 Clarinet Quintet fragment in F major, K. 580b/Anh. 90 - Allegro (for clarinet, basset horn, violin, viola and cello; 1789)

Serenades, divertimenti, and other instrumental works 

The production for instrumental ensembles includes several divertimenti, cassations, notturni, serenades, marches, dances, and a quodlibet, besides, of course, his symphonies. Mozart's production for orchestra is written for string ensembles (like the early Divertimenti K. 136–138), as well as for wind ensembles and the varied combinations of strings and winds.

Serenades 
Cassation in D major (Serenade No. 1), K. 100/62a (1769)
4 Contredanses in F major (Serenade No. 2), K. 101/250a (1776)
Serenade No. 3 in D major, "Antretter", K. 185/167a (1773)
Serenade No. 4 in D major, "Colloredo", K. 203/189b (1774)
Serenade No. 5 in D major, K. 204/213a (1775)
Serenade No. 6 in D major, "Serenata Notturna", K. 239 (1776)
Serenade No. 7 in D major, "Haffner", K. 250/248b (1776)
Notturno in D for Four Orchestras (Serenade No. 8), K. 286 (1776–77) (each of the four "orchestras" composed of 2 French horns in D, 2 violins, viola and cello)
Serenade No. 9 in D major, "Posthorn", K. 320 (1779)
Serenade No. 10 for twelve winds and double bass in B major, "Gran Partita", K. 361/370a (1781)
Serenade No. 11 for winds in E major, K. 375 (1781–82)
Serenade No. 12 for winds in C minor, K. 388/384a (1782)
Serenade No. 13 for string quartet and double bass in G major, "Eine kleine Nachtmusik", K. 525 (1787)

Others
 Cassation in B major, K. 99/63a (1769; Probable first performance based on ensemble)
 Cassation in G major, K. 63 (1769)
 Cassation in D major, K. 100/62a (alternative title: Serenade No. 1) (1769)

Divertimenti 
 Divertimento No. 1 in E major, K. 113 (1771)
 Divertimento No. 2 in D major, K. 131 (1772)
 Divertimento for string quartet or string orchestra in D major, K. 136/125a ("Salzburg Symphony No. 1") (1772)
 Divertimento for string quartet or string orchestra in B major, K. 137/125b ("Salzburg Symphony No. 2") (1772)
 Divertimento for string quartet or string orchestra in F major, K. 138/125c ("Salzburg Symphony No. 3") (1772)
 Divertimento No. 3 for winds in E major, K. 166/159d (1773)
 Divertimento No. 4 for winds in B major, K. 186/159b (1773)
 Divertimento No. 5 for winds in C major, K. 187 (Anh. C 17.12) (1773) (spurious, by Leopold Mozart)
 Divertimento No. 6 for winds in C major, K. 188/240b (1773)
 Divertimento No. 7 in D major, K. 205/167A (1773)
 Divertimento No. 8 for winds in F major, K. 213 (1775)
 Divertimento No. 9 for winds in B major, K. 240 (1776)
 Divertimento No. 10 in F major, K. 247, "Lodron No. 1" ("Lodronische Nachtmusik") (1776)
 Divertimento No. 11 in D major, K. 251 (1776)
 Divertimento No. 12 for winds in E major, K. 252/240a (1776)
 Divertimento No. 13 for winds in F major, K. 253 (1776)
 Divertimento for piano, violin and violoncello in B major, K. 254 ("Piano Trio No. 1") (1776)
 Divertimento No. 14 for winds in B major, K. 270 (1777)
 Divertimento No. 15 in B major, K. 287/271h "Lodron No. 2" ("Lodronische Nachtmusik") (1777)
 Divertimento No. 16 for winds in E major, K. 289/271g (1777) (doubtful)
 Divertimento No. 17 in D major, K. 334/320b (1779–80)
 Five Divertimentos (25 pieces) for three basset horns in B major, K. 439b (Anh. 229) (1783)
 Divertimento for two horns and strings in F major, "A Musical Joke" ("Ein musikalischer Spaß"), K. 522 (1785–87?)
 Divertimento for string trio in E major, K. 563 (1788)

Others
 Quodlibet, Gallimathias musicum in D major, K. 32 (1766)
 March and Divertimento in C major; the music title when the two marches of K. 214 are played before and after the three movements of Symphony in C major, K. 208+(102/213c) (Il re pastore) (1772, 1775)

Three Milanese Quartets called "Divertimento":
 String Quartet No. 2 in D major, K. 155/134a ("Divertimento") (1772)
 String Quartet No. 5 in F major, K. 158 ("Divertimento") (1772–73)
 String Quartet No. 6 in B major, K. 159 ("Divertimento") (1773)

Incomplete
 Divertimento in F major, K. 288/246c (1777) (incomplete)
 Divertimento in D major, K. 320B (1772–73) (incomplete)

Marches 
 March in D major, K. 62 (Introduction to K. 100 Serenade, also used in Mitridate, re di Ponto) (1769)
 March in D major, K. 189/167b (probably to open/close K. 185 Serenade) (1773)
 March in C major, K. 214 (two marches opening and closing the divertimento—three movements of Symphony in C major, K. 208+(102/213c)—Il re pastore) (1775)
 March in D major, K. 215/213b (to open and/or close Serenade, K. 204) (1775)
 March in D major, K. 237/189c (to open and/or close Serenade, K. 203) (1774)
 March in F major, K. 248 (for use with Divertimento No. 10, K. 247) (1776)
 March in D major, K. 249 (to open and/or close Serenade, "Haffner", K. 250) (1776)
 March in D major, K. 290 (for use with Divertimento No. 7, K. 205/167A) (1772)
 March in D major, K. 335/320a, No. 1 (probably to open Serenade, "Posthorn", K. 320) (1779)
 March in D major, K. 335/320a, No. 2 (probably to close Serenade, "Posthorn", K. 320) (1779)
 March in C major, K. 408/383e, No. 1 (1782)
 March in D major, K. 408/385a, No. 2 (1782)
 March in C major, K. 408/383F, No. 3 (1782)
 March in D major, K. 445/320c (for use with Divertimento No. 17, K. 334) (1780)

Others
 Cassation in G major, K. 63, first movement march (1769)
 Divertimento No. 11 in D major, K. 251, sixth movement (1776)
 March in D major, K. 544 (1788; lost)

Incomplete
 March in B major, K. 384b (1782?) (incomplete)

Dances 

Mozart left a huge production of dances for orchestra in different genres, including more than 100 minuets, over 30 contra dances, over 50 allemandes (Teitsch, Ländler, or German Dances), a gavotte (French folk dance) and ballet and pantomime music.

In his production of minuets, Mozart generally followed Haydn's example, preferring the slow character of the dance. Allemandes written between 1787 and 1791 were mainly for public balls in Vienna. In the Contredanse production, also written mainly in Vienna, some examples of program music are found, like Il Temporale, K. 534, La Bataille, K. 535, Canary, K. 600/5, etc.

Minuet
 7 Menuets, K. 61b/65a (1769)
 2 Menuets, K. 61g (1769–70)
 6 Menuets, K. 61h (including No. 3 Symphony in D major, K. 135+61h) (1769?)
 20 Menuets, K. 103/61d (1770-71)
 6 Menuets, K. 104/61e (1770–71)
 6 Menuets, K. 105/61f (doubtful) (1770-71)
 Menuet in E major, K. 122/73t (1770)
 6 Menuets, K. 164/130a (1772)
 16 Menuets, K. 176 (1773)
 3 Menuets, K. 363 (1783?)
 Symphonic Minuet in C major, K. 409/383f (1782)
 5 Menuets, K. 461/448a (1784)
 2 Minuets with Contredanses in F major and B major (Quadrilles), K. 463/448c (1784)
 12 Menuets, K. 568 (1788)
 12 Menuets, K. 585 (1789)
 6 Menuets, K. 599 (1791)
 4 Menuets, K. 601 (1791)
 2 Menuets, K. 604 (1791)
Contra dance
 4 Contredanses, K. 101/250a (alternative title: Serenade No. 2) (1776)
 Overture and 3 Contredanses, K. 106/588a (doubtful) (1790)
 Contredanse in B major, K. 123/73g (1770)
 4 Contredanses, K. 267/271c (1777)
 2 or 4 Contredanses for Count Johann Rudolf Czernin, K. 269b (1777)
 6 Contredanses, K. 462/448b (1784)
 9 Countredanses, K. 510/Anh.C 13.02 (1787)
 Contredanse in D major, "Das Donnerwetter" (The Thunderstorm), K. 534 (1788)
 Contredanse in C major, "La Bataille", K. 535 (1788)
 3 Contredanses, K. 535a (lost) (1788)
 Contredanse in B K. 535b (fragment) (1788)
 2 Contredanses, K. 565 (lost) (1788)
 Contredanse in D K. 565a (fragment) (1788)
 Contredanse in C major, "Der Sieg vom Helden Koburg" (Coburg's Victory), K. 587 (1789)
 2 Contredanses, K. 603 (1791)
 Contredanse in E major, "Il Trionfo delle Donne", K. 607/605a (1791)
 5 Contredanses, K. 609 (includes No. 1 "Non più andrai") (1791)
 Contredanse in G major, "Les filles malicieuses", K. 610 (1791)
Allemande
 6 German Dances, K. 509 (1787)
 6 German Dances, K. 536 (1788)
 6 German Dances, K. 567 (1788)
 6 German Dances, K. 571 (1789)
 12 German Dances, K. 586 (1789)
 6 German Dances, K. 600 (includes No. 5 Trio: "Der Kanarienvogel" The Canary) (1791)
 4 German Dances, K. 602 (includes No. 3 "Die Leirer") (1791)
 3 German Dances, K. 605 (includes No. 3 "Die Schlittenfahrt" Sleigh Ride) (1791)
 6 Ländler in B major, "Ländlerische Tänze", K. 606 (1791)
 German Dance in C major, K. 611 "Die Leirer" (1791)
Others
 Sketch of a ballet, Le gelosie del Serraglio, K. Anh. 109/135a (1772, fragment)
 Ballet, Les petits riens (The Little Nothings), K. Anh. 10/299b (1778)
 Sketches for a ballet intermezzo, "Bagatelles Ballet Pantomime", K. 299c (1778, fragment)
 La Chasse (The Hunt) in A major, K. Anh. 103/299d, (1778, fragment)
 Gavotte in B major, K. 300 (1778)
 Ballet music for Idomeneo, K. 367 (1781)
 Musik zu einer Pantomime: Pantalon und Colombine (Music to a Pantomime) in D major, K. 446/416d (1783, fragment)

Sacred music 
Mozart's sacred music is mainly vocal, though also instrumental examples exist, like the seventeen Sonate da chiesa, composed between 1772 and 1780. His sacred music presents a rich stylistic mosaic: Gregorian choral elements meet rigorous counterpoint, and even operatic elements can sometimes emerge. Stylistic unity and consistency is present over all his sacred music work.

Masses 

Missa brevis in G major, K. 49 (1768)
Missa brevis in D minor, K. 65 (1769)
Missa solemnis in C major, Dominicusmesse, K. 66 (1769)
Missa solemnis in C minor, Waisenhausmesse, K. 139 (1768)
Missa brevis in G major, Pastoralmesse, K. 140/Anh. C1.12 (1773; attribution uncertain)
Missa in honorem Sanctissimae Trinitatis, K. 167 (1773)
Missa brevis in F major, K. 192 (1774)
Missa brevis in D major, K. 194 (1774)
Sparrow Mass in C major, Spatzenmesse, K. 220 (1775–6)
Credo Mass in C major, Credo Mass, K. 257 (1776)
Missa brevis in C major, Piccolomesse, K. 258 (1775)
Missa brevis in C major, Organ Solo, K. 259 (1775–6)
Missa longa in C major, K. 262 (1776)
Missa brevis in B major, K. 275 (1777)
Coronation Mass, K. 317 (1779)
Missa solemnis, Missa aulica, K. 337 (1780)
Great Mass in C minor, K. 427/417a (1782–3; unfinished)
Requiem Mass in D minor, K. 626 (1791; unfinished, completed by Franz Xaver Süssmayr after Mozart's death)

Oratorios 
Die Schuldigkeit des ersten Gebots, K. 35 (1767) (Only the first part)
La Betulia liberata, K. 118/74c (1771)

Cantatas 
Grabmusik (Cantata on the Holy Grave of Christ), K. 42/35a (1767)
Davide penitente, K. 469 (1785)

Liturgical works 
Kyrie
Kyrie in F major, K. 33 (1766)
Kyrie in G major, K. 89/73k (1770 or 1772)
Kyrie in D minor for soprano, alto, tenor, bass, K. 90 (doubtful) (1771–72)
Kyrie in D major, K. 91/186i/Anh. 17 (spurious, originally by J. A. Reutter, terminated by Franz Xaver Süssmayr) (1774)
Kyrie in D minor, K. 341/368a (1787–91)
Kyrie in E major, K. 322/296a, (fragment; completed by Maximilian Stadler) (1787)
Kyrie in C major, K. Anh. 15/323 (fragment; completed by M. Stadler) (1779?)

Gradual
Sancta Maria, mater Dei in F major, K. 273 (1777)

Offertory
Scande Coeli Limina in C major, K. 34 (1767)
Inter natos mulierium in G major, K. 72/74f (1774)
Benedictus sit Deus in C major, K. 117; 66a/47b (1768)
Convertentur sedentes in D major, K. 177/Anh. C 3.09 (doubtful)
Sub tuum praesidium in F major, K. 198/Anh. C 03.08 (doubtful) (1775)
Misericordias Domini in D Minor, K. 222/205a (1775)
Venite populi in D major, K. 260/248a (1775)
Alma Dei creatoris in F major, K. 277/272a (1777)

Vespers
Vesperae solennes de Dominica in C major, K. 321 (1779)
Vesperae solennes de confessore in C major, K. 339 (1780)

Magnificat
Dixit Dominus and Magnificat in C major, K. 193/186g (1774)

Antiphon
Cibavit eos in A Minor, K. 44/73u (1770)
Quaerite primum regnum Dei in D Minor, K. 86/73v (1770)

Three settings of the Marian antiphon Regina coeli:
Regina coeli for soprano, chorus and orchestra in C major, K. 108/74d (1771)
Regina coeli for soprano, chorus and orchestra in B major, K. 127 (1772)
Regina coeli for soloists, chorus and orchestra in C major, K. 276/321b (1779)

Miserere
Miserere in A minor, K. 85/73s (1770)

Te Deum
Te Deum in C major, K. 141/66b (1769)

Litany

Litanies:
Litaniae Lauretanae in B major, K. 109/74e (1771)
Litaniae de venerabili altaris sacramento in B major, K. 125 (1772)
Litaniae Lauretenae in D major, K. 195/186d (1774)
Litaniae de venerabili altaris sacramento in E major, K. 243 (1776)

Other sacred works 
Motet
God is Our Refuge in G minor, K. 20 (1765)
Veni Sancte Spiritus in C major, K. 47 (1768)
Ergo interest (″Quaere superna″) for Soprano in G major, K. 143/73a (1773)
Exsultate, jubilate for Soprano in F major, K. 165/158a (1773)
Ave verum corpus in D major, K. 618 (1791)
Adoramus te in C minor, K. 327/Anh.A 10

Hymns and aria
Tantum Ergo in B major, K. 142/Anh. C 3.04 (doubtful)
Tantum Ergo in D major, K. 197/Anh. C 3.05 (doubtful)
Kommet her, ihr frechen Sünder for Soprano in B, K. 146/317b (1779)
"Zwei deutsche Kirchenlieder" (Two German Hymns), O Gotteslamm, Als aus Ägypten Israel, K. 343/336c (c. 1787)

Church sonatas 

 Church Sonata No. 1 in E, K. 67/41h (1772)
 Church Sonata No. 2 in B, K. 68/41i (1772)
 Church Sonata No. 3 in D, K. 69/41k (1772)
 Church Sonata No. 4 in D, K. 144/124a (1774)
 Church Sonata No. 5 in F, K. 145/124b (1774)
 Church Sonata No. 6 in B, K. 212 (1775)
 Church Sonata No. 7 in F, K. 224/241a (1776)
 Church Sonata No. 8 in A, K. 225/241b (1776)
 Church Sonata No. 9 in G, K. 241 (1776)
 Church Sonata No. 10 in F, K. 244 (1776)
 Church Sonata No. 11 in D, K. 245 (1776)
 Church Sonata No. 12 in C, K. 263 (1776)
 Church Sonata No. 13 in G, K. 274/271d (1777)
 Church Sonata No. 14 in C, K. 278/271e (1777)
 Church Sonata No. 15 in C, K. 328/317c (1779)
 Church Sonata No. 16 in C, K. 329/317a (1779)
 Church Sonata No. 17 in C, K. 336/336d (1780)

Others
Church Sonata in C major, K. 124c (fragment) 
Church Sonata in D major, K.Anh. 65a (fragment; spurious, attributed to Leopold Mozart)

Organ music 

 Fugue in E major, K. 153 (375f) (incomplete) (1782)
 Fugue in G minor, K. 154 (385k) (incomplete) (1782)
 Ouverture in C major, K. 399 (385i) (1782)
 Fugue in G minor, K. 401 (375e) (incomplete) (1782)
 Kleine Gigue in G, K. 574 (1789)
 Adagio in D minor, K.Anh. 35/593a (1790) 
 Adagio and Allegro in F minor for a Mechanical Organ, K. 594 (1790)
  (1791)
 Andante in F for a Small Mechanical Organ, K. 616 (1791)

Operas 

Apollo et Hyacinthus, K. 38 (1767)
Bastien und Bastienne, K. 50/46b (1768)
La finta semplice, K. 51 (1769)
Mitridate, re di Ponto, K. 87/74a (1770)
Ascanio in Alba, K. 111 (1771)
Il sogno di Scipione, K. 126 (1772)
Lucio Silla, K. 135 (1772)
Thamos, König in Ägypten, K. 345/336a (1773, 1779)
La finta giardiniera, K. 196 (1775)
Il re pastore, K. 208 (1775)
Zaide, K. 344 (1779-80)
Idomeneo, K. 366 (1781)
Die Entführung aus dem Serail, K. 384 (1782)
L'oca del Cairo, K. 422 (1783)
Lo sposo deluso, K. 430 (1783)
Der Schauspieldirektor, K. 486 (1786)
Le nozze di Figaro, K. 492 (1786)
Don Giovanni, K. 527 (1787)
Così fan tutte, K. 588 (1790)
Die Zauberflöte, K. 620 (1791)
La clemenza di Tito, K. 621 (1791)

Concert arias, songs and canons 

Leck mich im Arsch, canon in B major, K. 231/382cConservati fedele for Soprano in A major, K. 23 (The Hague, 1765-66)A Berenice for Soprano in G major, K.70/61c (1767-69)Ah, spiegarti, o Dio for Soprano in A major, K. 178/417e (1772)Con ossequio, con rispetto for Tenor in C major, K. 210 (Salzburg, May, 1775)Clarice cara mia sposa for Tenor in D major, K. 256 (1776)Ah, lo previdi for Soprano in C minor, K. 272 (1777)Alcandro, lo confesso for Soprano in E major, K. 294 (1778)Basta, vincesti for Soprano in E major, K. 486a/295a (1778)Così dunque tradisci for Bass in F minor, K. 432/421a (1783)Ch'io mi scordi di te? for Soprano in E major, K. 505 (December, 1786)Alcandro, lo confesso for Bass in F major, K. 512 (1787)Bella mia fiamma, addio for Soprano in C major, K. 528 (1787)Ah se in ciel for Soprano in F major, K. 538 (1778 or 1788)Un bacio di mano for Bass in F major, K. 541 (May, 1788)Al desio, di chi t'adora for Soprano in F major, K. 577 (1789; Composed in order to replace the Aria of Susanna "Deh vieni" in Le nozze di Figaro)Alma grande e nobil core for Soprano in B major, K. 578 (August, 1789)Chi sà, chi sà, qual sia for Soprano in C major, K. 582 (1789)

OthersAh, più tremar non voglio for Tenor in F major, K. 71 (1769; fragment)

 Masonic music 

The following are compositions written for the Masonic Lodge:

Song, "Lobegesang auf die feierliche Johannisloge" ("O heiliges Band der Freundschaft treuer Brüder") [O sacred bond of friendship between true brothers], K. 148/125h, (1772)
Cantata Dir, Seele des Weltalls, K. 429/468a (fragment, completed by Maximilian Stadler) (1783)
Song, "Lied zur Gesellenreise: Die ihr einem neuen Grad", K. 468, "for use at installation of new journeymen" (1785)
Cantata for tenor, male chorus, and orchestra Die Maurerfreude (The Freemason's Joy) K. 471 (1785)
The Masonic Funeral Music (Maurerische Trauermusik), K. 477/479a (1785)
Two songs for tenor and organ used for the opening and closing ceremonies of the lodge in Austria "Zur Neugekrönten Hoffnung":
"Zerfließet Heut, Geliebter Brüder", K. 483 (1786)
"Ihr Unsre Neuen Leiter", K. 484 (1786)
The Little German Cantata (Kleine Deutsche Kantate) ("Die ihr die unermeßlichen Weltalls Schöpfer ehrt"), for tenor and piano, for use at meetings of the Colony of the Friends of Nature, K. 619 (1791)
The Little Masonic Cantata "Laut verkünde unsre Freude", for soloists, male chorus, and orchestra, K. 623 (1791)
Song, "Laßt uns mit geschlungen Händen", K. 623a, ("for the close of the lodge" and intended final chorus to K. 623) (1791; attribution uncertain)

 Handel adaptations Acis und Galatea, K. 566 (1788)Der Messias, K. 572 (1789)Das Alexander-Fest, K. 591 (1790)Ode auf St. Caecilia, K. 592 (1790)

 See also 

 Mozart symphonies of spurious or doubtful authenticity

 References 

 External links 
 Publications of music and writings by Mozart from Project Gutenberg
 
 Free typeset sheet music of Mozart's works from the Mutopia Project
 Digital Mozart Edition, Neue Mozart-Ausgabe'' (NMA) Online (New Mozart Edition), 127 volumes
 A comprehensive list of Mozart's work from classical.net